Emily Swallow (born December 18, 1979) is an American actress. She is best known for her roles as Kim Fischer on The Mentalist and as Amara / The Darkness in the 11th season of Supernatural. She also appears as The Armorer in the Star Wars series The Mandalorian and had a minor role as Emily in the video game The Last of Us Part II.

Early life
Swallow was born on December 18, 1979, in Washington, D.C. She grew up in Sterling, Virginia and Jacksonville, Florida. While at Stanton College Preparatory School in Jacksonville, she began acting in various college, amateur, and professional theatre productions. She graduated in 2001 with a BA in Middle Eastern Studies from the University of Virginia, and then studied for an MFA in Acting from New York University’s Tisch School of the Arts.

Career

Swallow started her career in Broadway theatre, where she performed in various productions, including High Fidelity, King Lear, The Taming of the Shrew, A Midsummer Night's Dream, Cat on a Hot Tin Roof at the Guthrie Theater, Much Ado About Nothing for Shakespeare in the Park, and the world-premiere of off-Broadway shows Romantic Poetry and Measure for Pleasure.

In 2008, Swallow made her film debut in the military drama The Lucky Ones. She starred in world premieres of Donald Margulies' play The Country House at Los Angeles' Geffen Playhouse, opposite Mark Rylance in Louis Jenkins' play Nice Fish at the Guthrie Theatre, and in John Patrick Shanley's musical Romantic Poetry at Manhattan Theater Club. She won the Falstaff Award for best Female Performer in 2010 for her performance as Kate in The Taming of the Shrew.

In 2012, Swallow and fellow singer/comedian Jac Huberman created a stage show called Jac N Swallow, which they performed in New York at the Laurie Beeckman Theater and Joe's Pub. The show centers on the comic misadventures of the duo as they navigate very different life challenges with varying degrees of sanity and dignity. They are developing a series based on the characters. In 2013 she collaborated with Mark Rylance and poet Louis Jenkins on the world premiere of Nice Fish at the Guthrie Theater. In 2016 she was cast in the Center Theatre Group's production of Ayad Akhtar's Disgraced.

Swallow's first television role was in Guiding Light, and she later played parts in Southland, Ringer, The Good Wife, NCIS, Flight of the Conchords, Medium, as series regular Dr. Michelle Robidaux on TNT's medical drama Monday Mornings and Rizzoli & Isles. She had a starring role in The Mentalist as FBI agent Kim Fischer. In 2015 she was cast in the eleventh season of Supernatural as the new character Amara, "the Darkness".

Personal life
Swallow married actor Chad Kimball on August 26, 2018.

Filmography

Film

Television

Video games

References

External links
 
 
 
 

1979 births
Living people
Actresses from Jacksonville, Florida
University of Virginia alumni
Place of birth missing (living people)
Tisch School of the Arts alumni
American film actresses
American stage actresses
American television actresses
American video game actresses
21st-century American actresses